Leonel Teller (born 29 March 1961) is a Nicaraguan hurdler. He competed in the men's 400 metres hurdles at the 1980 Summer Olympics.

References

1961 births
Living people
Athletes (track and field) at the 1980 Summer Olympics
Nicaraguan male hurdlers
Olympic athletes of Nicaragua
Place of birth missing (living people)